Nicholas James Kruger (born 14 August 1983) is an Australian cricketer who has played first-class cricket for Queensland and List A cricket for Tasmania. A left hand opening batsman, Kruger made his debut in 2003 as 19-year-old, however, his career has been set back by a number of shoulder injuries. He scored his highest first-class score in a tour match against the touring West Indies cricket team in November 2009.

In 2011, Kruger transferred to Tasmania, and made his debut for them in a List A one-day game against Victoria at Hobart on 9 February 2011. He made 19 with the bat and took 2/25 with the ball.

References

1983 births
Living people
Queensland cricketers
Australian cricketers
Tasmania cricketers
Cricketers from Sydney